David Marine (20 September 1880 –  6 November 1976) was an American pathologist. He is remembered for his trial, with O. P. Kimball as his assistant, of the effect of giving iodide to a large group of schoolgirls in Akron, Ohio from 1917 to 1922, which greatly reduced their development of goiter, and resulted in the iodization of table salt.

References

1880 births
1976 deaths
American pathologists